Wakefield is an unincorporated community in Jefferson County, Indiana, in the United States.

History
A post office was established at Wakefield in 1899, and remained in operation until it was discontinued in 1905. The community was named for Robert Wakefield.
 
Wakefield was the home of the famous bird dog trainer Samuel M. Lewis. Sam raised his four children on his farm on Sage Lane. He was well known and liked in the area for many years (1915-2004). His daughter now lives on the farm.

References

Unincorporated communities in Jefferson County, Indiana
Unincorporated communities in Indiana